Suvorovskaya is a rural locality (a stanitsa) in Nizhnechirskoye Rural Settlement, Surovikinsky District, Volgograd Oblast, Russia. The population was 451 as of 2010.

Geography 
Suvorovskaya is located on the west bank of the Tsimlyansk Reservoir, 60 km southeast of Surovikino (the district's administrative centre) by road. Nizhny Chir is the nearest rural locality.

References 

Rural localities in Surovikinsky District
Don Host Oblast